The Gulf of Pozzuoli, formerly known as the Gulf of Puteoli, is a large bay or small gulf in the northwestern end of the Gulf of Naples in the Tyrrhenian Sea. It lies west of Naples and is named for its port of Pozzuoli. The Roman  was located within it, near the resort town of Baiae.

Along with the island of Ischia and gulfs of Naples and Gaeta, local waters are rich in productions enough to support various species of whales and dolphins, including fin and sperm whales.

See also
 Geography of Italy

References

Pozzuoli
Pozzuoli
Landforms of Campania
Landforms of the Tyrrhenian Sea
Geography of the Metropolitan City of Naples